Emmet Friars (born 14 September 1985 in Derry, Northern Ireland) is a footballer, who plays for NIFL Championship side Limavady United.

Career

Notts County
Emmet began his career as a trainee with Notts County, but failed to establish himself in the first team. He made 14 appearances and scored one goal whilst at the club, but was released at the end of the 2005–06 season.

He spent the start of the 2005–06 season playing on loan for non-league team AFC Telford United in the Northern Premier League Premier Division.

On 23 December 2006, Friars was sent out on loan to Hinckley United for the remainder of the 2006–07 season.

In May 2007, Tamworth general manager Russell Moore confirmed that Friars would not be with the club for the 2007–08 season, and that the former Notts County defender had returned to Northern Ireland.

Newry City
Friars trained with Belfast team Cliftonville, where his brother Sean was then playing, but was not offered a contract.

He then joined Newry City. who Sean was signed for at the time. Friars became a vital part of the Newry team and quickly established himself in team as starting left-back. He was Newry City's Player of the Year for the season 2007–08. For the 2008–09 season, Friars switched to the centre-back role, becoming a defensive rock. He also became club captain for a short while following the departure of Richard Clarke. While at Newry City, Emmet was a firm favourite with the fans.

Derry City
In February 2010, Friars signed with hometown club Derry City, a team he had been linked with several times, and won the League of Ireland First Division title that season.

Dungannon Swifts
On 3 January 2012, Emmet moved on to join Dungannon Swifts, the same day that his brother Sean Friars joined the club.

Portadown
On 1 May 2013, Portadown announced they had signed Friars. His contract was terminated by mutual consent on 2 September 2014.

Crusaders
Just hours after his release from Portadown, he signed for Crusaders and made his debut on 13 September against old club Dungannon Swifts.

Ballinamallard
On 29 July 2015, it was announced that Friars would join Ballinamallard United on loan until the end of the season. After Friars was obliged to miss Ballinamallard's first encounter against his parent club on 15 August, and before the closure of the registration window on 2 September, Friars transferred to Ballinamallard permanently.

Ards
In the summer of 2016, it was announced that Friars would be joining Niall Currie's Ards.

International career
Friars won seven caps for Northern Ireland Under-21s between 2004 and 2006.

References

External links

1985 births
Living people
Association footballers from Northern Ireland
Notts County F.C. players
Portadown F.C. players
AFC Telford United players
Tamworth F.C. players
Hinckley United F.C. players
Newry City F.C. players
Derry City F.C. players
Dungannon Swifts F.C. players
Crusaders F.C. players
League of Ireland players
NIFL Premiership players
Association football defenders
Ballymena United F.C. players
Ards F.C. players
Limavady United F.C. players
Ballinamallard United F.C. players